Seyyedabad (also romanized as Seyyedābād) is a village in Khormarud-e Shomali Rural District, in the Central District of Azadshahr County, Golestan Province, Iran. At the 2006 census, its population was 1,501, in 356 families.

References 

Populated places in Azadshahr County